Robert Walker (born 1903) was an English professional footballer who played as a centre forward.

Career
Born in Bradford, Walker signed for Bradford City from Wibsey in October 1920. He made 1 league appearance for the club, before moving to New Brighton in July 1924. He also played for Barrow and Bradford (Park Avenue).

Sources

References

1903 births
Date of death missing
English footballers
Bradford City A.F.C. players
New Brighton A.F.C. players
Barrow A.F.C. players
Bradford (Park Avenue) A.F.C. players
English Football League players
Association football forwards